Richard Roland Schoon (born 23 June 1928) was a Singaporean field hockey player. He competed in the men's tournament at the 1956 Summer Olympics.

References

External links
 
 

1928 births
Living people
Singaporean male field hockey players
Olympic field hockey players of Singapore
Field hockey players at the 1956 Summer Olympics
Place of birth missing (living people)
20th-century Singaporean people